is a Japanese dancer and actor. He is one of the performers of the J-Pop group The Rampage from Exile Tribe.

Iwaya is represented with LDH.

Career 
In 2007, Iwaya started dancing in "Exile Live Tour 2007 Exile Evolution".

He attended EXPG Osaka school.

From 2011 to 2013, Iwaya was active as a support member of Generations.

In March 2014, he auditioned for Exile Performer Battle Audition (to find a new performer for EXILE) but didn't make it to the finals. In April of the same year, he was announced as a candidate member of The Rampage, and in September he became an official member.

In October 2016, he made his acting debut with High & Low The Movie.

Personal life 
Gekidan Exile's Kanta Sato was his classmate.

Filmography

Movies

Dramas

Stage

TV Shows

Music videos

References

External links 
 The Rampage Official Website

1997 births
21st-century Japanese male actors
Japanese male dancers
LDH (company) artists
Living people
People from Osaka Prefecture